Lachen can refer to:

Places 
 Lachen, Switzerland, a municipality of the Canton of Schwyz
 Lachen, Germany, a municipality of Bavaria
 Lachen, Sikkim – a town in India
 Lachen River, in India

Other 
 The German and Dutch words for laughing